Cross Fell is the highest mountain in the Pennines of Northern England and the highest point in England outside the Lake District. It is located in the North Pennines Area of Outstanding Natural Beauty. It lies within the county of Cumbria and the historic county boundaries of Cumberland.

The three adjoining fells form an escarpment that rises steeply above the Eden Valley on its south-western side and drops off more gently on its north-eastern side towards the South Tyne and Tees Valleys.

Cross Fell summit is crowned by a cross-shaped dry-stone shelter. On a clear day there are excellent views from the summit across the Eden Valley to the mountains of the Lake District. On the northern side of Cross Fell there are also fine views across the Solway Firth to the Southern Uplands of Scotland.

The fell is prone to dense hill fog and fierce winds. A shrieking noise induced by the Helm Wind is a characteristic of the locality. It can be an inhospitable place for much of the year. In ancient times it was known as "Fiends Fell" and believed to be the haunt of evil spirits. St Augustine of Canterbury is said to have blessed the hill when he arrived here on his travels so it became known as Cross Fell in the Christian tradition, although it has been speculated that the fell became known as Cross Fell ("cross" meaning "angry") because of the evil spirits.

Local geography

The upper parts of Cross Fell and the adjoining fells are formed mainly from beds of mudstone, sandstone and siltstone of the Yoredale Group whilst lower ground is formed by multiple layers of the Carboniferous Limestone. Where erosion-resistant beds surfaces, there are steep rock face. There are also strata of shale and gritstone that surface on the fell. On the south and west facing slopes of Cross Fell the rock faces have been broken up by frost action to give a scree slope made up of large boulders. The local terrain shows obvious evidence of recent glaciation and is covered by thin soil and acidic peat.

This is the largest block of high ground in England and tends to retain snow-cover longer than neighbouring areas. Snow can be found in gullies on the north side of Cross Fell as late as May in most years. In some years, lying snow has been known to persist until July and fresh snowfall in June (mid-summer in the Northern Hemisphere) is common.

Local flora includes a number of rare alpine plants such as the Starry Saxifrage and a mountain Forget-me-not. Cross Fell is covered by what is known as "siliceous alpine and boreal grassland". It is the southernmost outlier of this vegetation type, which is common to highlands in Scotland and Scandinavia. It is a designated Special Area of Conservation (SAC). Local farmers are required to keep free-roaming sheep off the tops of the fells in order to avoid damaging the natural flora.

Cross Fell is a conspicuous feature in the landscape. It dominates the skyline on almost the entire  length of the A66 trunk road between Penrith and Stainmore. It can also be seen from many points in the Lake District, including the Helvellyn summit, and from high ground throughout Dumfriesshire and Northumberland.

Notes

References

External links

Panoramas

Marilyns of England
Hewitts of England
Mountains and hills of the Pennines
Mountains and hills of Cumbria
Nuttalls
Regionally Important Geological / Geomorphological Sites (RIGS) in Cumbria
Culgaith